Robert Beggs (25 February 1911 – 7 May 1993) was an Irish Gaelic footballer who played for club sides Skerries Harps and Wolfe Tones and at inter-county level with the Dublin and Galway senior football teams.

Career

Beggs first came to prominence as a Gaelic footballer on the Dublin senior team that lost the 1934 All-Ireland final to Galway. A short time after this defeat, he took up employment in Galway and transferred his football allegiance. Beggs's seven seasons with the Galway senior team yielded a National League title, three Connacht Championship medals and All-Ireland success after a defeat of Kerry in the 1938 final. He also enjoyed club success with the Wolfe Tones club and won two County Championship titles. After returning to Dublin, Beggs once again lined out with his native county and claimed a second All-Ireland winners' medal in 1942 at the expense of his former team. He also secured Railway Cup medals with both Leinster and Connacht.

Personal life and death

Born in Skerries, County Dublin, Beggs spent his entire adult life working as a fisherman in his hometown and in Claddagh, County Galway. His Galway-born son, Brian Beggs, won an All-Ireland Minor Championship title with Dublin in 1958. Beggs died in Beaumont Hospital on 7 May 1993 after suffering a stroke.

Honours

Wolfe Tones
Galway Senior Football Championship: 1936, 1941

Galway
All-Ireland Senior Football Championship: 1938
Connacht Senior Football Championship: 1938, 1940, 1941
National Football League: 1939-40

Dublin
All-Ireland Senior Football Championship: 1942
Leinster Senior Football Championship: 1934, 1942

Leinster
Railway Cup: 1935

Connacht
Railway Cup: 1936, 1937

References

1911 births
1993 deaths
Skerries Harps Gaelic footballers
Dublin inter-county Gaelic footballers
Galway inter-county Gaelic footballers
Gaelic football backs
People from Skerries, Dublin
Sportspeople from Fingal